The 2018 Kansas City Royals season was their 50th season for the franchise, and their 46th at Kauffman Stadium. They significantly failed to improve upon their 80-82 record the previous year, reaching 100+ losses for the first time since 2006 and finishing 58-104, the second-worst record in the 2018 MLB season, ahead of only the Baltimore Orioles, who finished 47-115.

Offseason

Transactions

November 2, 2017: 1B Eric Hosmer, 3B Mike Moustakas, RHP Peter Moylan, LHP Jason Vargas, RHP Trevor Cahill, RF Melky Cabrera, CF Lorenzo Cain, and SS Alcides Escobar elected free agency.  Activated RHP Nate Karns, LHP Brian Flynn, CF Bubba Starling, and RHP Miguel Almonte from the 60-day disabled list.
November 3, 2017: LHP Mike Minor elected free agency.
November 20, 2017: Selected the contract of C Meibrys Viloria from Lexington Legends.  Selected the contract of LHP Tim Hill from Northwest Arkansas Naturals.  Selected the contract of LHP Eric Stout from Omaha Storm Chasers.
December 1, 2017: LF Terrance Gore elected free agency.
December 2, 2017: Signed free agent LF Terrance Gore to a minor league contract and invited him to spring training.
December 5, 2017: Signed free agent RHP Wily Peralta.
December 7, 2017: Signed free agent RHP Scott Barlow.
December 8, 2017: Seattle Mariners claim Mike Morin off waivers.
December 14, 2017: New York Mets traded RHP Burch Smith for Future Considerations.  Cincinnati Reds traded RHP Brad Keller for Future Considerations.
December 15, 2017: Signed free agent RHP Mike Broadway to a minor league contract.  Signed free agent DH Cody Asche to a minor league contract and invited him to spring training.
January 4, 2018: Chicago White Sox traded 2B Jake Peter to Los Angeles Dodgers; Dodgers traded cash, RHP Joakim Soria and LHP Luis Avilan to White Sox; Dodgers traded SS Erick Mejia and RHP Trevor Oaks to Royals; Royals traded RHP Joakim Soria and LHP Scott Alexander to Dodgers.
January 12, 2018: Signed free agent SS Guillermo Fernandez to a minor league contract.
January 13, 2018: Signed free agent RHP Luis Barroso to a minor league contract.
January 16, 2018: Signed free agent RHP Clayton Mortensen and OF Tyler Collins to minor league contracts.  Collins invited to spring training.
January 25, 2018: Signed free agent SS Ryan Goins to a minor league contract and invited him to spring training.

Regular season

Game log

|-style=background:#fbb
|1||March 29|| White Sox || 7–14 || Shields (1–0) || Duffy (0–1)||—|| 36,517 || 0–1 || L1
|-style=background:#fbb
|2||March 31|| White Sox || 3–4 || Farquhar (1–0) || Maurer (0–1) || Soria (1) || 37,093 ||  0–2 || L2
|-

|-style=background:#bbb
|—||April 1|| White Sox || colspan="7" |Postponed (snow)  (Rescheduled for April 28)
|-style=background:#fbb
|3||April 2||@ Tigers || 1–6 || Liriano (1–0) || Hammel (0–1) ||—|| 15,476 || 0–3 || L3
|-style=background:#bfb
|4||April 3||@ Tigers ||1–0|| Junis (1–0) || Boyd (0–1) || Herrera (1)|| 15,083 || 1–3 || W1
|-style=background:#bbb
|—||April 4||@ Tigers ||colspan="7" |Postponed (weather)  (Rescheduled for April 20)
|-style=background:#fbb
|5||April 6||@ Indians || 2–3 || Carrasco (2–0) || Duffy (0–2) || Allen (2)  || 34,720 || 1–4 || L1
|-style=background:#bfb
|6||April 7||@ Indians || 1–0|| Kennedy (1–0) || Bauer (0–1) || Herrera (2) || 17,362 || 2–4 || W1
|-style=background:#fbb
|7||April 8||@ Indians || 1–3 || Allen (1–0) || Maurer (0–2) ||—|| 14,240 || 2–5 || L1
|-style=background:#bfb
|8||April 9|| Mariners || 10–0 ||Junis (2–0) || Gonzales (1–1) ||—|| 12,324 || 3–5 || W1
|-style=background:#fbb
|9||April 10|| Mariners || 3–8 || Hernández (2–1) || Skoglund (0–1) ||—|| 14,850 || 3–6 || L1
|-style=background:#fbb
|10||April 11|| Mariners || 2–4 || Vincent (1–0) || Grimm (0–1) || Díaz (4) || 14,314 || 3–7 || L2
|-style=background:#fbb
|11||April 12|| Angels || 1–7 || Tropeano (1–0) || Kennedy (1–1) ||—|| 14,714 || 3–8 || L3
|-style=background:#fbb
|12||April 13|| Angels ||4–5|| Wood (1–0) || Grimm (0–2) || Middleton (3) || 15,011 || 3–9 || L4
|-style=background:#fbb
|13||April 14|| Angels || 3–5 || Richards (2–0) || Junis (2–1) || Middleton (4) || 15,876 || 3–10 || L5
|-style=background:#bbb
|—||April 15|| Angels || colspan="7" |Postponed (cold)  (Rescheduled for June 25)
|-style=background:#bbb
|—||April 16||@ Blue Jays || colspan="7" |Postponed (Weather related damage to Rogers Centre roof)  (Rescheduled for April 17)
|-style=background:#fbb
|14||April 17||@ Blue Jays || 3–11|| García (2–0) || Skoglund (0–2) ||—|| N/A || 3–11 || L6
|-style=background:#fbb
|15||April 17||@ Blue Jays || 4–5(10) || Clippard (2–0) || Flynn (0–1) ||—|| 18,645 || 3–12 || L7
|-style=background:#fbb
|16||April 18||@ Blue Jays || 5–15 || Happ (3–1) || Kennedy (1–2) ||—|| 28,803 || 3–13 || L8
|-style=background:#fbb
|17||April 20||@ Tigers ||2–3(10) || Jiménez (2–0) || Keller (0–1) ||—|| 15,406 || 3–14 || L9
|-style=background:#bfb
|18||April 20||@ Tigers || 3–2 || Junis (3–1) || Greene (1–1) || Herrera (3) || 17,194 || 4–14 || W1
|-style=background:#fbb
|19||April 21||@ Tigers ||4–12||Fiers (2–1)|| Duffy (0–3)||Saupold (1)||19,302|| 4–15||L1
|-style=background:#bfb
|20||April 22||@ Tigers || 8–5 || McCarthy (1–0) || VerHagen (0–1) || Herrera (4) || 19,034 || 5–15 || W1
|-style=background:#fbb
|21||April 24|| Brewers || 2–5 || Davies (2–2) || Kennedy (1–3) ||—|| 16,555 || 5–16 || L1
|-style=background:#fbb
|22||April 25|| Brewers || 2–6 || Chacín (2–1) || Hammel (0–2) ||—|| 13,389 || 5–17 || L2
|-style=background:#fbb
|23||April 26|| White Sox || 3–6 || Giolito (1–3) || Junis (3–2) || Soria (3) || 18,315 || 5–18 || L3
|-style=background:#fbb
|24||April 27|| White Sox || 4–7(11) || Infante (1–3) || Hill (0–1) || Soria (4) || 15,395 || 5–19 || L4
|-style=background:#fbb
|25||April 28|| White Sox || 0–8 || Fulmer (2–1) || Oaks (0–1) ||—|| 16,971 || 5–20 || L5
|-style=background:#bfb
|26||April 28|| White Sox || 5–2 || Skoglund (1–2) || Covey (0–1) || Herrera (5) || 16,070 || 6–20 || W1
|-style=background:#bfb
|27||April 29|| White Sox || 5–4 || McCarthy (2–0) || Rondón (1–1) || Boyer (1) || 23,892 || 7–20 || W2
|-style=background:#fbb
|28||April 30||@ Red Sox || 6–10 || Velázquez (4–0) || Hammel (0–3) ||—|| 31,314 || 7–21 || L1
|-

|-style=background:#bfb
|29||May 1||@ Red Sox || 7–6 (13)|| Herrera (1–0) || Johnson (1–1) || Flynn (1) || 34,466 || 8–21 || W1
|-style=background:#fbb
|30||May 2||@ Red Sox || 4–5 || Pomeranz (1–1) || Duffy (0–4) || Kimbrel (8) || 32,267 || 8–22 || L1
|-style=background:#bfb
|31||May 3|| Tigers || 10–6 || McCarthy (3–0) || Bell (0–1) ||—|| 28,866 || 9–22 || W1
|-style=background:#bfb
|32||May 4|| Tigers || 4–2 || Boyer (1–0) || Stumpf (1–1) || Herrera (6) || 24,648 || 10–22 || W2
|-style=background:#fbb
|33||May 5|| Tigers ||2–3 || Zimmermann (2–0) || Hammel (0–4) || Greene (6) || 20,708 || 10–23 ||L1
|-style=background:#bfb
|34||May 6|| Tigers ||4–2 || Junis (4–2) || Boyd (1–3) || Herrera (7) || 18,424 || 11–23 || W1
|-style=background:#bfb
|35||May 8||@ Orioles || 15–7 || Duffy (1–4) || Bundy (1–5) ||—|| 10,863 || 12–23 || W2
|-style=background:#fbb
|36||May 9||@ Orioles || 3–5 || Bleier (3–0) || McCarthy (3–1) || Brach (4) || 14,375 || 12–24 || L1
|-style=background:#fbb
|37||May 10||@ Orioles || 6–11 || Castro (1–1) || Kennedy (1–4) ||—|| 17,842 || 12–25 || L2
|-style=background:#bfb
|38||May 11||@ Indians || 10–9 || Keller (1–1) || Miller (1–1) || Herrera (8) || 24,408 || 13–25 || W1
|-style=background:#fbb
|39||May 12||@ Indians || 2–6 ||Clevinger (3–0)|| Junis (4–3)
|—||24,587||13–26||L1
|-style=background:#fbb
|40||May 13||@ Indians || 2–11 || Kluber (6–2)||Duffy (1–5)||—||22,105||13–27||L2
|-style=background:#fbb
|41||May 14|| Rays || 1–2 || Yarbrough (3–2) || Skoglund (1–3) || Colomé (7) || 14,174 || 13–28 || L3
|-style=background:#fbb
|42||May 15|| Rays || 5–6 || Venters (1–0) || Herrera (1–1) || Colomé (8) || 21,500 || 13–29 || L4
|-style=background:#fbb
|43||May 16|| Rays || 3–5 || Andriese (1–1) || Hammel (0–5) || Colomé (9) || 19,611 || 13–30 ||L5
|-style=background:#bfb
|44||May 18|| Yankees || 5–2 || Junis (5–3) || Sabathia (2–1) || Herrera (9) || 26,433 || 14–30 || W1
|-style=background:#fbb
|45||May 19|| Yankees || 3–8 || Severino (7–1) || Duffy (1–6) ||—|| 33,684 || 14–31 || L1
|-style=background:#fbb
|46||May 20|| Yankees || 1–10 || Gray (3–3) || Skoglund (1–4) ||—|| 24,121 || 14–32 || L2
|-style=background:#fbb
|47||May 21||@ Cardinals ||0–6 || Mikolas (6–0) || Kennedy (1–5) ||—|| 42,140 || 14–33 || L3
|-style=background:#bfb
|48||May 22||@ Cardinals || 5–1 || Hammel (1–5) || Weaver (3–4) ||—|| 39,545 || 15–33 || W1
|-style=background:#bfb
|49||May 23||@ Cardinals ||5–2 (10) || Boyer (2–0) || Norris (1–1) || Herrera (10) || 41,984 || 16–33 || W2
|-style=background:#bfb
|50||May 24||@ Rangers || 8–2 || Duffy (2–6) || Bibens-Dirkx (0–1) ||—|| 23,230 || 17–33 || W3
|-style=background:#fbb
|51||May 25||@ Rangers || 4–8 || Minor (4–3) || Skoglund (1–5) || Kela (11) || 35,105 || 17–34 || L1
|-style=background:#fbb
|52||May 26||@ Rangers || 3–4 (10) || Claudio (3–2) || McCarthy (3–2) || — || 29,644 || 17–35 || L2
|-style=background:#bfb
|53||May 27||@ Rangers || 5–3 || Hammel (2–5) || Hamels (3–5) || Herrera (11) || 31,898 || 18–35 || W1
|-style=background:#fbb
|54||May 28|| Twins || 5–8 || Lynn (3–4) || Junis (5–4) || Rodney (11) || 18,572 || 18–36 || L1
|-style=background:#bfb
|55||May 29|| Twins || 2–1 (14) || Barlow (1–0) || Rogers (1–2) ||—|| 20,533 || 19–36 || W1
|-style=background:#bfb
|56||May 30|| Twins || 11–8 || McCarthy (4–2) || Romero (2–2) || Herrera (12) || 21,343 ||20–36 || W2
|-

|-style=background:#fbb
|57||June 1|| A's || 0–16 || Montas (2–0) || Kennedy (1–6) ||—|| 23,413 || 20–37 || L1
|-style=background:#bfb
|58||June 2|| A's || 5–4 || Hill (1–1) || Petit (2–2) || Herrera (13) || 24,553 || 21–37 || W1
|-style=background:#fbb
|59||June 3|| A's || 1–5 || Trivino (3–0) || Junis (5–5) ||—|| 19,424 || 21–38 || L1
|-style=background:#fbb
|60||June 4||@ Angels || 6–9 || Bedrosian (2–1) || Hill (1–2) || Parker (4) || 32,553 || 21–39 || L2
|-style=background:#fbb
|61||June 5||@ Angels || 0–1 || Heaney (3–4) || Keller (1–2) ||—|| 31,514 || 21–40 || L3
|-style=background:#fbb
|62||June 6||@ Angels || 3–4 || Bedrosian (3–1) || Barlow (1–1) || Parker (5) || 36,512 || 21–41 || L4
|-style=background:#fbb
|63||June 7||@ A's ||1–4|| Blackburn (1–0) || Hammel (2–6) || Treinen (14) || 7,963 || 21–42 || L5
|-style=background:#fbb
|64||June 8||@ A's || 2–7 || Montas (3–0) || Junis (5–6) || Trivino (1) || 10,132 || 21–43 || L6
|-style=background:#bfb
|65||June 9||@ A's || 2–0 || Duffy (3–6) || Bassitt (0–1) || Herrera (14) || 16,208 || 22–43 || W1
|-style=background:#fbb
|66||June 10||@ A's || 2–3 || Treinen (3–1) || Adam (0–1) ||—|| 15,548 || 22–44 || L1
|-style=background:#fbb
|67||June 12|| Reds || 1–5 (10) || Hernandez (2–0) || McCarthy (4–3) || — || 20,476 || 22–45 || L2
|-style=background:#fbb
|68||June 13|| Reds || 0–7 || Mahle (5–6) || Hammel (2–7) ||—|| 24,899 || 22–46 || L3
|-style=background:#fbb
|69||June 15|| Astros || 3–7 || Morton (8–1) || Junis (5–7) ||—|| 27,603 || 22–47 || L4
|-style=background:#fbb
|70||June 16|| Astros || 2–10 || Keuchel (4–8) || Duffy (3–7) ||—|| 20,637 || 22–48 || L5
|-style=background:#fbb
|71||June 17|| Astros || 4–7 || Sipp (2–0) || Maurer (0–3) || Rondón (4) || 22,236 || 22–49 || L6
|-style=background:#fbb
|72||June 18|| Rangers || 3–6 || Colón (4–4) || Kennedy (1–7) || Kela (16) || 18,319 || 22–50 || L7
|-style=background:#fbb
|73||June 19|| Rangers || 1–4 || Hamels (4–6) || Hammel (2–8) || Kela (17) || 17,789 || 22–51 || L8
|-style=background:#fbb
|74||June 20|| Rangers || 2–3 || Bibens-Dirkx (1–1) || Junis (5–8) || Diekman (2) || 19,489 || 22–52 || L9
|-style=background:#bfb
|75||June 22||@ Astros || 1–0 || Grimm (1–2) || Giles (0–2) || Hill (1) || 39,357 || 23–52 || W1
|-style=background:#fbb
|76||June 23||@ Astros ||3–4(12)|| McHugh (3–0) || Grimm (1–3) ||—|| 40,028 || 23–53 || L1
|-style=background:#fbb
|77||June 24||@ Astros || 3–11 || Cole (9–1) || Hammel (2–9) ||—|| 41,823 || 23–54 || L2
|-style=background:#bfb
|78||June 25|| Angels || 2–0|| Keller (2–2) || Skaggs (6–5) || Peralta (1) || 19,535 || 24–54 || W1
|-style=background:#fbb
|79||June 26||@ Brewers ||1–5|| Peralta (3–0) || Junis (5–9) || Hader (7)|| 34,412 ||24–55 || L1
|-style=background:#bfb
|80||June 27||@ Brewers || 5–4 || Duffy (4–7) || Suter (8–5) || Peralta (2) || 38,436 || 25–55 || W1
|-style=background:#fbb
|81||June 29||@ Mariners || 1–4 || Gonzales (8–5) || Kennedy (1–8) ||—|| 25,558 || 25–56 || L1
|-style=background:#fbb
|82||June 30||@ Mariners || 4–6 || Hernández (8–6) || Hammel (2–10) || Díaz (31) || 33,395 || 25–57 || L2
|-

|-style=background:#fbb
|83||July 1||@ Mariners ||0–1 || Paxton (8–2) ||  Keller (2–3) || Díaz (32) || 38,344 || 25–58 || L3
|-style=background:#fbb
|84||July 2|| Indians || 3–9 || Kluber (12–4) || Junis (5–10) ||—|| 18,285 || 25–59 || L4
|-style=background:#fbb
|85||July 3|| Indians || 4–6 || Bieber (4–0) || Duffy (4–8) || Allen (17) || 19,005 || 25–60 || L5
|-style=background:#fbb
|86||July 4|| Indians || 2–3 || Bauer (8–6) || Oaks (0–2) || Allen (18) || 22,001 || 25–61 || L6
|-style=background:#fbb
|87||July 6|| Red Sox ||5–10||Sale (9–4)||Hammel (2–11)
|—|| 24,673 || 25–62|| L7
|-style=background:#fbb
|88||July 7|| Red Sox ||4–15||Hembree (4–1)||Adam (0–2)||—|| 30,347 ||25–63 || L8
|-style=background:#fbb
|89||July 8|| Red Sox || 4–7 || Porcello (11–3) || Fillmyer (0–1) || Kimbrel (27) || 28,443 || 25–64 || L9
|-style=background:#fbb
|90||July 9||@ Twins || 1–3 || Berríos (9–7) || Hill (1–3) || Rodney (20) || 20,199 || 25–65 || L10
|-style=background:#bfb
|91||July 10||@ Twins || 9–4 || Flynn (1–1) || Slegers (1–1) ||—|| 27,551 || 26–65 || W1
|-style=background:#fbb
|92||July 11||@ Twins || 5–8 || Lynn (7–7) || Sparkman (0–1) ||—|| 26,708 || 26–66 || L1
|-style=background:#fbb
|93||July 13||@ White Sox || 6–9 || Shields (4–10) || Keller (2–4) ||Soria (14) || 19,361 || 26–67 || L2
|-style=background:#bfb
|94||July 14||@ White Sox || 5–0 || Duffy (5–8) || López (4–7) ||—|| 20,159 || 27–67 || W1
|-style=background:#fbb
|95||July 15||@ White Sox || 1–10 || Giolito (6–8) || Smith (0–1) ||—|| 23,434 || 27–68 || L1
|-style=background:#bbbfff
|colspan="10"|89th All-Star Game in Washington, D.C.
|-style=background:#bfb
|96||July 20|| Twins || 6–5 ||  Duffy (6–8) || Gibson (4–7) || Maurer (1) || 27,719 || 28–68 || W1
|-style=background:#bfb
|97||July 21|| Twins || 4–2 || Flynn (2–1) || Lynn (7–8) || Peralta (3) || 22,159 || 29–68 || W2
|-style=background:#bfb
|98||July 22|| Twins || 5–3 || Keller (3–4) || Duke (3–4)  || Peralta (4) || 18,107 || 30–68 || W3
|-style=background:#fbb
|99||July 23|| Tigers || 4–5 || Wilson (1–3) || Maurer (0–4) || Greene (20) || 18,370 || 30–69 || L1
|-style=background:#bfb
|100||July 24|| Tigers || 5–4 || Smith (1–1) || Zimmermann (4–2) || Peralta (5) || 25,957 || 31–69 || W1
|-style=background:#fbb
|101||July 25|| Tigers || 4–8 || Boyd (5–9) || Duffy (6–9) ||—|| 17,382 || 31–70 || L1
|-style=background:#fbb
|102||July 26||@ Yankees || 2–7 || Gray (8–7) || Junis (5–11) ||—|| 46,965 || 31–71 || L2
|-style=background:#bbb
|—||July 27|| @ Yankees || colspan="7" |Postponed (weather)  (Rescheduled for July 28)
|-style=background:#bfb
|103||July 28||@ Yankees || 10–5 || Keller (4–4) || Severino (14–4) ||—|| 46,571 || 32–71 || W1
|-style=background:#fbb
|104||July 28||@ Yankees || 4–5 || Betances (2–3) || Flynn (2–2) || Chapman (27) || 45,043 || 32–72 || L1
|-style=background:#fbb
|105||July 29||@ Yankees || 3–6 || Happ (11–6) || Smith (1–2) || Chapman (28) || 46,192 || 32–73 || L2
|-style=background:#bfb
|106||July 31||@ White Sox || 4–2 || Duffy (7–9)  || Shields (4–13) || Peralta (6) || 15,250 || 33–73 || W1
|-

|-style=background:#bfb
|107||August 1||@ White Sox || 10–5 || Junis (6–11) || Covey (4–7) ||—|| 18,019 || 34–73 || W2
|-style=background:#fbb
|108||August 2||@ White Sox || 4–6 || Cedeño (1–0) || Adam (0–3) || Avilán (1) || 19,682 || 34–74 || L1 
|-style=background:#fbb
|109||August 3||@ Twins || 4–6 || Moya (1–0) || Flynn (2–3) || Rodney (23) || 22,236 || 34–75 || L2
|-style=background:#fbb
|110||August 4||@ Twins || 2–8 || Berríos (11–8) || Smith (1–3) ||—|| 27,909 || 34–76 || L3
|-style=background:#fbb
|111||August 5||@ Twins || 5–6 || Moya (2–0) || Duffy (7–10) || Rodney (24) || 25,390 || 34–77 || L4
|-style=background:#fbb
|112||August 6|| Cubs || 1–3 || Hamels (2–0) || McCarthy (4–4) || Strop (8) || 32,339 || 34–78 || L5
|-style=background:#fbb
|113||August 7|| Cubs || 0–5 || Montgomery (4–4) || Keller (4–5) ||—|| 27,883 || 34–79 || L6
|-style=background:#bfb
|114||August 8|| Cubs || 9–0 || Fillmyer (1–1) || Quintana (10–8) ||—|| 24,294 || 35–79 || W1
|-style=background:#fbb
|115||August 10|| Cardinals || 0–7 || Gomber (2–0) || Smith (1–4) || Poncedeleon (1) || 29,414 || 35–80 || L1
|-style=background:#fbb
|116||August 11|| Cardinals || 3–8 || Flaherty (6–6) || Duffy (7–11) || Hicks (3) || 38,427 || 35–81 || L2
|-style=background:#fbb
|117||August 12|| Cardinals || 2–8 || Ross (7–9) || Hammel (2–12) ||—|| 23.409 || 35–82 || L3
|-style=background:#bfb
|118||August 13|| Blue Jays || 3–1 || Keller (5–5) || Reid-Foley (0–1) || Peralta (7) || 14,721 || 36–82 || W1
|-style=background:#fbb
|119||August 14|| Blue Jays || 5–6 || Petricka (2–1) || Boyer (2–1) || Giles (14) || 13,680 || 36–83 || L1
|-style=background:#fbb
|120||August 15|| Blue Jays || 5–6 || Estrada (6–9) || López (0–1) || Giles (15) || 14,391 || 36–84 || L2
|-style=background:#bfb
|121||August 16|| Blue Jays || 6–2 || Flynn (3–3) || Gaviglio (2–6) ||—|| 14,894 || 37–84 || W1
|-style=background:#fbb
|122||August 17||@ White Sox || 3–9 || Shields (5–14) || Hill (1–4) ||—|| 24,556 || 37–85 || L1
|-style=background:#bfb
|123||August 18||@ White Sox || 3–1 || Keller (6–5) || Covey (4–10) || Peralta (8) || 19,018 || 38–85 || W1
|-style=background:#fbb
|124||August 19||@ White Sox || 6–7 || Santiago (5–3) || Flynn (3–4) || Fry (2) || 22,033 || 38–86 || L1
|-style=background:#fbb
|125||August 20||@ Rays || 0–1 || Yarbrough (12–5) || López (0–2) || Alvarado (5) || 10,036 || 38–87 || L2
|-style=background:#fbb
|126||August 21||@ Rays || 1–4 || Snell (15–5) || Sparkman (0–2) || Romo (17) || 9,402 || 38–88 || L3
|-style=background:#fbb
|127||August 22||@ Rays || 3–6 || Chirinos (2–5) || Junis (6–12) || Romo (18) || 8,638 || 38–89 || L4
|-style=background:#fbb
|128||August 23||@ Rays || 3–4 || Romo (3–3) || Flynn (3–5) ||—|| 9,088 || 38–90 || L5
|-style=background:#bfb
|129||August 24|| Indians || 5–4 || Peralta (1–0) || Allen (4–5) ||—|| 19,304 || 39–90 || W1
|-style=background:#bfb
|130||August 25|| Indians || 7–1 || Fillmyer (2–1) || Kluber (16–7) ||—|| 16,894 || 40–90 || W2
|-style=background:#fbb
|131||August 26|| Indians || 5–12 || Bieber (8–2) || López (0–3) ||—|| 18,575 || 40–91 || L1
|-style=background:#bfb
|132||August 28|| Tigers || 6–2 || Junis (7–12) || Boyd (8–12) ||—|| 16,888 || 41–91 || W1
|-style=background:#bfb
|133||August 29|| Tigers || 9–2 || Duffy (8–11) || Fulmer (3–10) ||—|| 17,091 || 42–91 || W2
|-style=background:#bfb
|134||August 31|| Orioles || 9–2 || Keller (7–5) || Cashner (4–13) ||—|| 15,394 || 43–91 || W3
|-

|-style=background:#bfb
|135||September 1|| Orioles || 5–4 || Newberry (1–0) || Givens (0–7) ||—|| 15,358 || 44–91 || W4
|-style=background:#bfb
|136||September 2|| Orioles || 9–1 || López (1–3) || Hess (3–9) ||—|| 18,463 || 45–91 || W5
|-style=background:#bfb
|137||September 3||@ Indians || 5–1 || Junis (8–12) || Plutko (4–5) || Hill (2) || 20,536 || 46–91 || W6
|-style=background:#fbb
|138||September 4||@ Indians || 3–9 || Clevinger (11–7) || Duffy (8–12) ||—|| 17,041 || 46–92 || L1
|-style=background:#fbb
|139||September 5||@ Indians || 1–3 || Kluber (18–7) || Keller (7–6) || Hand (8) || 18,435 || 46–93 || L2
|-style=background:#fbb
|140||September 7||@ Twins || 6–10 || May (4–1) || Sparkman (0–3) ||—|| 19,944 || 46–94 || L3
|-style=background:#bfb
|141||September 8||@ Twins || 4–1 || López (2–3) || Berríos (11–11) || Peralta (9) || 25,814 || 47–94 || W1
|-style=background:#fbb
|142||September 9||@ Twins || 1–3 || Hildenberger (4–3) || Hammel (2–13) ||—|| 20,903 || 47–95 || L1
|-style=background:#bfb
|143||September 10|| White Sox || 4–3 (10) || Newberry (2–0) || Gómez (0–2) ||—|| 17,809 || 48–95 || W1
|-style=background:#bfb
|144||September 11|| White Sox || 6–3 || Keller (8–6) || Covey (5–13) || Peralta (10) || 17,613 || 49–95 || W2
|-style=background:#fbb
|145||September 12|| White Sox || 2–4 (12) || Minaya (2–2) || Smith (1–5) || Santiago (2) || 17,840 || 49–96 || L1
|-style=background:#bfb
|146||September 13|| Twins || 6–4 || Fillmyer (3–1) || Busenitz (4–1) || Peralta (11) || 18,745 || 50–96 || W1
|-style=background:#bfb
|147||September 14|| Twins || 8–4 || Hammel (3–13) || Hildenberger (4–4) ||—|| 18,389 || 51–96 || W2
|-style=background:#bfb
|148||September 15|| Twins || 10–3 || Kennedy (2–8) || De Jong (0–1) ||—|| 19,505 || 52–96 || W3
|-style=background:#fbb
|149||September 16|| Twins || 6–9 || Gibson (8–13) || Vasto (0–1) ||—|| 20,286 || 52–97 || L1
|-style=background:#fbb
|150||September 17||@ Pirates || 6–7 || Santana (3–3) || Lively (0–1) ||—|| 10,316 || 52–98 || L2
|-style=background:#fbb
|151||September 18||@ Pirates || 1–2 (11) || Crick (3–2) || Smith (1–5) ||—|| 11,566 || 52–99 || L3
|-style=background:#fbb
|152||September 19||@ Pirates || 1–2 || Archer (5–8) || Fillmyer (3–2) || Vázquez (35) || 13,073 || 52–100 || L4
|-style=background:#fbb
|153||September 20||@ Tigers || 8–11 || Reininger (1–0) || López (2–4) ||—|| 20,282 || 52–101 || L5
|-style=background:#bfb
|154||September 21||@ Tigers || 4–3 || Kennedy (3–8) || Liriano (5–11) || Peralta (12) || 22,001 || 53–101 || W1
|-style=background:#fbb
|155||September 22||@ Tigers || 4–5 || Jiménez (5–4) || Hammel (3–14) || Greene (31) || 24,815 || 53–102 || L1
|-style=background:#bfb
|156||September 23||@ Tigers || 3–2 || Keller (9–6) || VerHagen (3–3) || Peralta (13) || 24,230 || 54–102 || W1
|-style=background:#bfb
|157||September 25||@ Reds || 4–3 || McCarthy (5–4) || Iglesias (2–5) || Peralta (14) || 13,172 || 55–102 || W2
|-style=background:#bfb
|158||September 26||@ Reds || 6-1 || Fillmyer (4–2) || Reed (1–3) || — || 12,549  || 56–102 || W3
|-style=background:#bfb
|159||September 27|| Indians || 2–1 (10)|| Hammel (4–14) || Ramírez (0–3) || — || 19,262 || 57–102 || W4
|-style=background:#fbb
|160||September 28|| Indians || 6–14 || Clevinger (13–8) || Kennedy (3–9) ||—|| 15,920 || 57–103 || L1
|-style=background:#bfb
|161||September 29|| Indians || 9–4 || Junis (9–12) || Miller (2–4) || — || 23,324 || 58–103 || W1
|-style=background:#fbb
|162||September 30|| Indians || 1–2 || Carrasco (17–10) || Skoglund (1–6) || Bauer (1) || 19,690 || 58–104 || L1
|-

|- style="text-align:center;"
| Legend:       = Win       = Loss       = PostponementBold = Royals team member

Season standings

American League Central

American League Wild Card

Record against opponents

Roster

Farm system

References

External links
Kansas City Royals Official Site 
2018 Kansas City Royals at Baseball Reference

Kansas City Royals
Kansas City Royals seasons
Kansas City Royals